Aboubacar Mario Bangoura (born 1977) is a Guinean football referee. He referees at the 2014 FIFA World Cup qualifiers.

References

External links 
 
 

1977 births
Living people
Guinean football referees
Date of birth missing (living people)